The 2005 Women's Junior Pan-Am Championship was the 5th edition of the Women's Pan American Junior Championship. It was held from 16 – 27 March 2005 in San Juan, Puerto Rico.

The tournament served as a qualifier for the 2005 Junior World Cup, held in Santiago, Chile in September 2005.

Argentina won the tournament for the 5th time, defeating the United States 3–1 in the final. Chile won the bronze medal by defeating Canada 2–1 in the third and fourth place playoff.

Participating nations
A total of twelve teams participated in the tournament:

Results

First round

Pool A

Pool B

Second round

Ninth to twelfth place classification

Crossover

Eleventh and twelfth place

Ninth and tenth place

Fifth to eighth place classification

Crossover

Seventh and eighth place

Fifth and Sixth place

First to fourth place classification

Semi-finals

Third and fourth place

Final

Statistics

Final standings

References

2005
2005 in women's field hockey
2005 Women's Pan-Am Junior Championship
2005 in Puerto Rican sports
March 2005 sports events in North America
Sports in San Juan, Puerto Rico
21st century in San Juan, Puerto Rico
Pan American Junior Championship